Bahri Oruçi (Serbian:  Bahri Oruči) (9 February 1930 – 16 November 2011) served as Chairman of the Executive Council of the Socialist Autonomous Province of Kosovo within the former Yugoslavia from May 1978 to May 1980. He was succeeded in office by Riza Sapunxhiu.

1930 births
2011 deaths
Politicians from Mitrovica, Kosovo
People from Skenderaj